The Divinity Criterion or Divine Equilibrium or Universal Divinity is a refinement of Perfect Bayesian equilibrium in a signaling game proposed by Banks and Sobel (1987). One of the most widely applied refinement is the D1-Criterion.

It is a restriction of receiver's beliefs to the type of senders for whom deviating towards an off-the-equilibrium message could improve their outcome compared to the equilibrium payoff.  In addition to the restriction suggested by the Intuitive Criterion, the Divinity Criterion considers only those types which are most likely to send the off-the-equilibrium message.

If more than one sender could benefit from the deviation, the Intuition Criterion assigns equal probabilities for all the senders, whereas the D1-Criterion considers different probabilities.

Example
The following example is adapted from the original Banks and Sobel (1987). 

Consider a case of sequential settlement. The defendant (sender of messages) has two types: t1 and t2. Type t1 is not negligent and type t2 is negligent. The defendant can offer a high settlement or low settlement (messages) to the plaintiff. The plaintiff (receiver of messages) can either accept or reject the settlement offer. The payoff is illustrated below.

Here the payoff shows that if the plaintiff accepts the high settlement, the money transfer is larger (5 instead of 3 in the low settlement case). If the plaintiff rejects the offer, then the negligent type t2 receives a higher penalty from the court (-11 comparing with -6 for type t1). However, since the plaintiff does not know the type, he is better off to accept the settlement when the defendant is not negligent.

Consider the prior probably to be half and half, meaning that before seeing the settlement offer the plaintiff believes that with 50 percent of the probability that the defendant is negligent. In this case, the game has two pooling equilibria. The first equilibrium (E1) is that both types of defendant choose a low settlement, and the plaintiff accepts the offer. The second equilibrium (E2) is that both types of defendant choose a high settlement, and the plaintiff accepts the offer. However, in order to support these equilibria, one also has to specify what are the beliefs if the plaintiff sees a different type of offer (commonly referred as off-equilibrium messages). 

From the payoff matrix we can see that under E1, the defendant is already getting his highest possible payoff (-3). Thus, regardless of what the plaintiff thinks, the defendant does not have incentive to deviate. This reasoning is not true if the equilibrium is E2. The idea of equilibrium refinement is indeed to provide a reasonable argument to select the most "intuitive" outcome.

To see how the refinement works, we first need to check what kind of beliefs can support E2. In this case, in order for the defendant not to have incentive to deviate to low settlement, the plaintiff has to respond with "Reject" if he sees a low settlement, which translates into that the plaintiff has to have a belief that the defendant is negligent (type t2) with probability larger than 60 percent (if this is true, then "accept" gives the plaintiff a payoff of 3, and "reject" gives the plaintiff a payoff of slightly more than 3=5*60%). Implicitly, the belief says that type t2 is more likely to deviate than t1. The D1 criterion (or the more advanced version of divinity) is built on the idea of deciding which type is actually more likely to deviate.

If we look again at the payoff matrix under the low settlement case, then regardless of how the plaintiff assigns his probability of choosing "accept" or "reject", the payoff for type t1 is higher than type t2 (for example, if the plaintiff plays a strategy of choosing equally between "accept" and "reject", then type t1 gets -4.5, whereas type t2 gets -7). Thus, comparing with the equilibrium payoff of -5 under E2, one can argue that whenever t2 wants to deviate, type t1 also wants to deviate. Thus, a reasonable belief should assign a higher probability to type t1. The D1 criterion pushes this type of reasoning to the extreme and requires that the plaintiff believes that the deviation (if observed) should come from t1. As a result, E2 is not plausible because it contradicts with the refinement.

References 

Game theory equilibrium concepts